Dick Weldon Simpson is a professor, author, politician, activist, political consultant, and filmmaker who formerly served as a Chicago alderman from 1971 through 1979.

Simpson is considered to be a progressive. An independent associated with the lakefront liberals during his time on the Chicago City Council, he ran in 1992 and 1994, unsuccessfully, as a challenger to incumbent Democrat Dan Rostenkowski in that party's primary for Illinois's 5th congressional district.

From 1967 until 2022, Simpson was a professor of political science at the University of Illinois at Chicago. From 2006 until 2012, he served as the head of the university's political science department. Simpson has also worked on political campaigns and as a government advisor. He has written an extensive amount of published material on the subject of government and politics.

Early life
Simpson was born in 1940 in Houston, Texas. He was an only child. His first name is Dick, rather than "Dick" being a nickname for Richard, as it commonly is.  Simpson's family lived in a middle class household.

Participating in the civil rights movement, Simpson took part in a 1960 stand-in protest.

Simpson graduated from University of Texas in 1963. He received his PhD from Indiana University. He spent some time in Africa completing research for his doctoral dissertation. While living in Africa, he wrote to his adviser specifically requesting for him to find him a job in a large city with racial conflict, as Simpson desired to be part of the progressive political transformation of a city.

Early career
Simpson began teaching as a political science professor at the University of Illinois at Chicago (UIC) in 1967.

During the 1968 Democratic Party presidential primaries, he first became Eugene McCarthy's campaign manager for Illinois's 9th congressional district, then was promoted to his statewide Illinois campaign manager, a role he held up through the 1968 Democratic National Convention. Simpson participated in protests held during the convention.

In 1969, Simpson managed the successful 44th Ward aldermanic campaign of William Singer, a reform-minded independent liberal. Singer, a 29-year old political newcomer, won an upset victory over a candidate supported by the city's Democratic political machine. Singer's victory was by a razor-thin 427 votes in the runoff election against an opponent backed by the by the Democratic Party organization. Singer's election was seen as ushering in an era of prominence for the city's lakefront liberal voting bloc.

Simpson was a cofounder of the Independent Precinct Organization, where he also served as executive director.

Aldermanic career
Simpson served two terms as a Chicago alderman for the 44th Ward, from 1971 through 1979.

Election campaigns
Simpson was first elected in 1971 in an open race. Incumbent 44th ward alderman William Singer was redistricted into the 43rd ward. In the redistricting that took place before the 1971 election, the 44th ward was redrawn to include less of the heavily Jewish and politically independent lakefront, and to include more of the heavily Democratic areas to the west, making it a harder district for Simpson to win as an independent than it had been for Singer to win as an independent. Nevertheless, Simpson defeated the city's Democratic machine to win election to the 44th Ward seat, defeating James B. Kargman. Kragman had carried the support of the city's Democratic Party, as well as the endorsements some prominent Democratic politicians, such as Adlai Stevenson III and Sidney R. Yates. Simpson was supported by lakefront liberal voters. Simpson ran on a platform that advocated for community control of municipal programs such as urban renewal. Community groups of the 44th ward were in the midst of a dispute with the city over urban renewal at the time of the election. The third candidate originally on the ballot in the 1971 race, Laura C. Keith, withdrew weeks before the election and endorsed Simpson.

Simpson was reelected alderman in 1975, again defeating an opponent supported by the city's Democratic Party organization, Edward Marsalek. Weeks ahead of the election, a third candidate, Wesley Pucinski (the brother of then-41st ward alderman Roman Pucinski) withdrew from the race and endorsed Marsalek. The Committee for and Effective City Council, a group founded to support the election of "independent" candidates to the Chicago City Council, endorsed Simpson and twelve other aldermanic candidates (including fellow incumbents William Cousins, Anna Langford, and John Hoellen) on the same day that Pucinksi withdrew.

Tenure
As an alderman, Simpson remained a political independent. He was among a handful of liberal alderman on the Chicago City Council. He was an advocate of political reform. He was supported by the lakefront liberals. Throughout his tenure, Simpson remained a professor in political science at the University of Illinois at Chicago.

During his time on the City Council, Simpson was a critic of Richard J. Daley. After he was elected alderman in February 1971, alderman-elect Simpson endorsed Daley's Republican opponent Richard Freidman in the 1971 Chicago mayoral election (for which the general election was held in April). Daley and Simpson first directly butted heads early into Simpson's tenure as an alderman, when, on July 27, 1971, he questioned Daley's proposed appointment of Thomas Keane Jr, son of Daley's City Council floor leader, alderman Thomas E. Keane, to the city's Zoning Board of Appeals. He questioned the conflict of appointing Keane Jr., vice-president of Arthur Rubloff & Co., one of the city's largest real estate firms. There were other instances where heated arguments erputed between Simpson and Daley. In once instance, Simpson angered Daley so severely that Daley attempted to have the City Council's sergeant of arms force Simpson back into his seat.

Simpson became the leader of the minority bloc of independents on the Chicago City Council. As such, Simpson came into conflict with Michael Bilandic, first during Bilandic's stint as Daley's floor leader on the City Council, and later when Bilandic took office as mayor after Daley's death in office. Simpson, along with fellow independent alderman Martin J. Oberman, was one of only two aldermen to vote against the resolution appointing Bilandic to hold the mayoralty after Daley's death. Like with Daley, he frequently stood in strong opposition to Bilandic during Bilandic's mayoralty.

Being in the minority opposition to mayors Daley and Bilandic, Simpson's proposed legislation were usually defeated. In some instances, the ideas he proposed in legislation were taken by alderman who were aligned with the majority supporting Daley, who then proposed the same ideas in pieces of legislation without Simpson's name attached. One of the few pieces of legislation Simpson managed to pass as an alderman was an ordinance which would prevent banks and insurance companies that do business with the city from practicing redlining. The resolution, which Simpson had feared would have little chance of passing, was passed on June 26, 1974 in an unanimous 44–0 vote after it was amended by Daley-aligned alderman Paul Wigoda. Another piece of legislation that Simpson saw passed was a November 1977 resolution calling for an investigation into figures utilized the previous summer to justify a 11.7% fare increase to the city's taxis. This came after former city commissioner Jane Byrne alleged a city hall "conspiracy" to raise the rates of taxis. The resolution creating this investigation, proposed by Simpson and fellow independent aldermen Ross Lathrop and Martin J. Oberman, was passed unanimously by the council. The investigation was later ended by a Chicago City Council vote of 40–3 in April 1978 to accept the investigative committee's majority report over the minority report written by Simpson, Lathrop, and Oberman as investigative committee members. While few wholesale pieces of legislation authored by Simpson were passed, Simpson saw occasional success in making amendments to legislation.

In March 1977, Simpson and fellow aldermen Dennis H. Block, Ross Lathrop, Martin Oberman proposed a piece of legislation that would have established community zoning boards in each of the 50 wards of the city.

Simpson established a "ward assembly" for the 44th Ward. This was a form of direct democracy within the ward, which was dismantled after the Democratic machine later regained control of the 44th Ward seat. It was one of Simpson's 1971 campaign promises that he would establish such an assembly if elected alderman. Similarly, some other independent candidates that year had made similar campaign pledges.

In 1978, Milton Rakove, a professor of political science at University of Illinois at Chicago, characterized Simpson's approach to being an alderman as, "an academic idealist at loose in the arena of politics, who cannot and will not make the compromises a true politician must make." Decades after Simpson left the council, journalist and news editor Bruce Dold remarked,

Retirement from City Council
Simpson opted against seeking reelection in 1979. He endorsed independent candidate Bruce Young, the director of the Jane Addams Center of Hull House, to succeed him. Young pledged, as a candidate, to support existing legislation and ordinances that Simpson had proposed on issues such as redlining, the creation of a code hearing bureau, starting an independent audit of the city's finances, and the establishment of a commission on governmental integrity. Young's opponent was John McCaffrey, who had the backing of the city's Democratic Party. Young won election but resigned soon after taking office, citing "personal reasons".

Post-aldermanic career
Following his retirement from the Chicago City Council, Simpson has continued to remain involved in Chicago's political discourse. Bruce Dold has remarked that Simpson, "has remained a trusted [political] critic for decades." Among his activities, he has worked as a political consultant, written about politics, run for United States Congress, and taught politics as an educator. In 2015, Ben Jarovsky of the Chicago Reader observed that Simpson has remained a political outsider and continues to assail corruption in Chicago's politics.

Until retiring in 2022, Simpson continued to teach as a professor at UIC. From 2006 until 2012, Simpson was head of the political science department. He was also a Great Cities Scholar and a Humanities Institute Fellow at UIC and served as director of the University's Preparing Future Faculty Program. In his professorial career, he formerly served as and executive board member of the Illinois Political Science Association, serving for some time as its president. He also worked as co-editor of the Illinois Political Science Review.  Simpson participated in annual studies conducted by UIC to measure how independently alderman are voting from the mayor. He was also involved in authoring studies by UIC that ranked cities and states in the United States by their level of corruption.

Simpson has also become a respected political analyst. He was, for three years, a monthly op-ed columnist for the Chicago Journal, and was subsequently a monthly columnist for the Chicago Sun-Times. Simpson has also been a filmmaker.

In 1979, Simpson served as an advisor on the mayoral transition team of Jane Byrne. He also served on the mayoral transition team of Harold Washington in 1983. Simpson was involved in a number of political campaigns in the 1980s, such as the campaign of Ron Sable for Simpson's former 44th Ward aldermanic seat. He also ran the organization I CARE (Independent Coalition Against Reagan Economics), which opposed the economic policies of President Ronald Reagan. Simpson endorsed Timothy C. Evans in the 1989 Chicago mayoral special election. Simpson was involved in Woody Bowman's campaign for Illinois Comptroller in 1990. Simpson also worked on both the unsuccessful 1990 Cook County State's Attorney campaign of Ray Smith and the successful 1990 campaign of Jack O'Malley for the same office. After the 1990 elections, Simpson served on David Orr's transition team for Cook County Clerk as well as Jack O'Malley's transition team for Cook County State's Attorney in 1990.

Simpson was twice an unsuccessful candidate for United States congress. Simpson first ran against Dan Rostenkowski in the Democratic primary for the redrawn 5th congressional district in 1992. Posing the greatest reelection challenge Rostenkowski had faced, Simpson won approximately 43% of the vote against Rostenkowski. Rostenkowski, chairman of United States House Committee on Ways and Means, was considered among the nation's most powerful congressmen. Simpson ran on a platform of congressional reform, including support for term limits. His campaign platform also focused on women's rights, universal health care, economic recovery, and senior citizens issues. Simpson also pledged to recreate a version of his 44th ward assembly in the congressional district. During the campaign, he aggressively criticized Rostenkowski. In February 1993, Simpson announced that he would file a formal complaint against Rostenkowski with the Federal Election Commission and the House Ethics Committee urging them to investigate $37,750 in spending by Rostenkowski's American Leaders Fund, alleging Rostenkowski had illegally used fund from this group to aid his reelection campaign.

Simpson again challenged Rostenkowski for the Democratic nomination in 1994. At the time, Rostenkowski was under grand jury investigation, and was also being challenged for the nomination by John Cullerton. Simpson and Cullerton were joined in challenging Rostenkowski by former alderman Michael Wojik and LaRouche movement member John McCarthy. In 1994, Simpson criticized Rostenkowski as corrupt and criticized him for votes such as his vote in support of extending the Hyde Amendment. Simpson placed third behind Rostenkowski and Cullerton. Simpson ran on many of the same issues in 1994 that he had in 1992.

For the 2000 Illinois Democratic Party presidential primary, Simpson was an alternate delegate candidate for Bill Bradley's campaign.

Simpson served on Lisa Madigan's transition team for Illinois Attorney General in 2003.

In the 2004 United States presidential election, Simpson served first as a member of the Issues Committee of Carol Moseley Braun's campaign, and subsequently as a surrogate for the John Kerry campaign.

After Langdon Neale retired from the Chicago Board of Election Commissioners, Simpson applied in December 2015 to fill the seat. His candidacy for the position was endorsed by Danny K. Davis, Mike Quigley, Joe Moore, and David Orr. He was one of seven finalists for the position. Judge Timothy C. Evans, who was in charge of appointing Neale's replacement, ultimately chose to instead appoint Jonathan T. Swain.

Simpson supported Chuy García's candidacy in the 2015 Chicago mayoral election. Simpson was considered the earliest significant figure to support the campaign Lori Lightfoot in the 2019 Chicago mayoral election. He formally did so on August 21, 2018. Simpson helped then-candidate Lightfoot to write a plan which included putting an end to the practice of aldermanic prerogative and banning outside employment of aldermen. For a long while, Simpson was considered the most prominent individual to have endorsed Lightfoot, still being considered such as late as mid-January 2019 (just over one month a week before Lightfoot would place first the first round of the election). Lightfoot would go on to be elected mayor. After Lightfoot became mayor, Simpson worked to advise her on ethics reform. Simpson has voiced his support for Lightfoot's reelection in the 2023 Chicago mayoral election. 

In 2021, Simpson participated in an effort run by a coalition of civic groups which formed an independent citizens commission that would draw a ward redistricting map for the city council, producing an alternative proposal to the ward map that would be drawn-up by members of the Chicago City Council itself as part of the council's decennial redistricting. Simpson was a member of the selection commission that would choose the citizens to participate in the effort.

Electoral history

Aldermanic

Congressional

Bibliography

Books authored
Simpson has been an author or co-author of more than twenty books. These include:

Articles
Simpson has published in excess of 100 journal articles, magazine articles, book chapters, and book reviews. Simpson was, for three years, a monthly op-ed columnist for the Chicago Journal, and was subsequently a monthly columnist for the Chicago Sun-Times. He also formerly was co-editor of the Illinois Political Science Review.

Journal articles

Book reviews

Other academic work

Opinion and commentary articles

Other written work
Letter written to Derek Shearer on May 7, 1975 providing descriptions of several experimental political ordinance undertaken in Chicago since 1971
Compilation of Chicago aldermanic voting records on key issues (2000–2002) – compiled by Simpson, Ruben Feliciano, Rick Howard, and Aaron Van Klyton (University of Illinois at Chicago Political Science Department)

References

Chicago City Council members
Illinois Independents
Illinois Democrats
University of Illinois Chicago faculty
1940 births
Living people
Politicians from Houston
Writers from Houston
Writers from Chicago
Date of birth unknown
University of Texas at Austin alumni
American political consultants
American campaign managers
Filmmakers from Illinois
Activists from Illinois
American political scientists
Political science journal editors
Filmmakers from Texas
Activists from Texas